Gündüzlü is a village in the Kozluk District, Batman Province, Turkey. Its population is 190 (2021).

The hamlet of Kalkancık is attached to the village.

References

Villages in Kozluk District
Kurdish settlements in Batman Province